The Rio de Janeiro bus system forms an important part of the public transport system in the city of Rio de Janeiro in Brazil. 

As of the end of 2015, there were 1,752 bus routes servicing the Rio de Janeiro Metropolitan Region, including 705 licensed by the municipality of Rio de Janeiro.

Municipal buses
The City of Rio de Janeiro bus fleet is made up of over 8,000 vehicles, operated by 47 different companies.

BRT
BRT is a bus rapid transit system that, as of 2017, the consists of three operating lines, Transcarioca, Transoeste and Transolímpica.

Bus terminals

References

Transport in Rio de Janeiro (city)
Public transport in Rio de Janeiro (city)